Maulawi Noor Jalal (born 1969), also spelt Nur Jalal, is an Afghan Taliban politician who has served as the acting Deputy Minister of Interior Affairs of the Islamic Emirate of Afghanistan from 7 September 2021. He also served in this position in the previous Taliban government (1996–2001). He is a cousin of Najibullah Haqqani, the Minister of Communications since 7 September 2021.

Early life 
Jalal was born in 1969 in Lajen village, Shegal District, Kunar Province, Afghanistan. He is a member of the Shinwari Pashtun tribe.

Political career 
In the first Taliban government of 1996 to 2001, Jalal served as Deputy Minister of Interior Affairs. On 23 February 2001, he was placed on a UN sanctions list.

In 2011, Jalal worked for a Kabul-based non-governmental organisation involved in conflict resolution.

On 7 September 2021, Jalal was made Deputy Minister of Interior Affairs of the newly re-established Islamic Emirate of Afghanistan, under Minister of Interior Affairs Sirajuddin Haqqani.

References 

Living people
Taliban government ministers of Afghanistan
1969 births